Bo Levi Mitchell (born March 3, 1990) is an American professional Canadian football quarterback for the Hamilton Tiger-Cats of the Canadian Football League (CFL). He originally signed with the Calgary Stampeders in 2012 and became the team's starting quarterback for the 2014 season, setting a number of club and league records including best record for a first time starting quarterback in league history (12 wins, 1 loss). He won the 102nd Grey Cup in 2014, the CFL's Most Outstanding Player Award in 2016 and 2018, and the 106th Grey Cup in 2018. With his second Grey Cup win as starter, he became the first quarterback to start and win multiple Grey Cup games with the Stampeders organization.

Early years
Mitchell graduated from Katy High School in Katy, Texas in 2008. As a senior in 2007, he passed for 2,451 yards and 37 touchdowns with only four interceptions. He led Katy to a 16–0 undefeated season and a state championship. He was named to the Houston Chronicle's Houston Top 110. Mitchell chose to attend SMU over an offer from Hawaii. Mitchell was also recruited by Eastern Washington.

College career

SMU
Mitchell played two seasons at SMU, starting all 19 of the games he played. In his career, he completed 385-of-676 passes (57.0 percent) for 4,590 yards (241.6 per game) with 36 touchdowns and 33 interceptions. His efficiency rating was 121.8.

As a sophomore in 2009, he started SMU's first seven games before suffering an injury and being replaced by freshman Kyle Padron. Mitchell completed 56 percent of his passes for 1,725 yards, 12 touchdowns and 10 interceptions, for a passing efficiency rating of 117.9. However, SMU was 3–4 in those seven games before winning five of its last six to finish 8–5.

Eastern Washington
As a junior in 2010, Mitchell transferred to Eastern Washington University, which had previously recruited Mitchell out of high school. He helped lead EWU to victory in the FCS Championship Game, a 20–19 come-from-behind victory over the University of Delaware, the school's first national championship in football. He was named the game's Most Outstanding Player after throwing three touchdown passes in the final 16 minutes of the game and had 302 total passing yards in the game as well.

In the 2011 season, Mitchell led the FCS in four statistical categories, including passing yards (4,009) and touchdown passes (33) on his way to breaking four school records. He broke EWU's record for single season passing yards with 4,009, which ranks 17th in FCS history and fifth in Big Sky Conference history. Mitchell went on to win the Walter Payton Award as the best offensive player in the FCS and was also named the 2011 Big Sky Conference Offensive Player of the Year. Mitchell was also named to seven All-America teams this season, earning first team honors on six of them. He was the top quarterback on teams selected by The Sports Network, American Football Coaches Association, Walter Camp, Associated Press, Phil Steele Publications and Beyond Sports College Network.

Professional career

Calgary Stampeders
Mitchell went undrafted in the 2012 NFL Draft. On April 30, 2012, the Calgary Stampeders of the Canadian Football League signed Mitchell to a free agent contract. Mitchell saw limited playing time in the 2012 CFL season, playing as a 3rd-string backup behind Drew Tate and Kevin Glenn and ahead of Brad Sinopoli. He began the 2013 CFL season as the 3rd-string QB. Mitchell came on in the third-quarter after Kevin Glenn left with an injury (Drew Tate was already injured) and helped the Stamps to overcome a 24-point deficit to defeat the Alouettes on July 20, 2013.

In his first CFL start, on July 26, 2013, Mitchell completed 29 of 33 attempts while passing for 376 yards, in a big win over the Winnipeg Blue Bombers. Mitchell won the Gibson's Finest Offensive Player of the Week for this performance. The 2013 season proved to be a breakout season for Mitchell. He played significant time at quarterback in 5 of the games, and appeared in another 7 games. His completion percentage was an impressive 69.6%, throwing for 1,156 yards with 10 touchdowns and only 3 interceptions: a quarterback rating of 111.2.

On January 14, 2014, Mitchell signed a contract extension with the Stampeders, which was set to keep him in Calgary through 2016. On June 14, 2014, Mitchell began the 2014 pre season with the Calgary Stampeders. The first week/game he played  one quarter and ended the night with 76 passing yards in a 23–20 victory over the Winnipeg Blue Bombers. On June 20, 2014, in the second week of pre season against the BC Lions Mitchell threw for 100 yards, 0 TD'S and 2 INT. On June 23, he was named the starting QB for their week 1 game against the Montreal Alouettes. On opening day, Bo Levi Mitchell gave the Calgary Stampeders their first win of the season 29–8 against the Montreal Alouettes. Mitchell had 313 passing yards and 2 touchdowns and 0 interceptions.  On Thursday, July 24, 2014, Bo Levi Mitchell tied Jeff Garcia's CFL record for consecutive career starts, going 7–0, with a 26–22 victory over the Edmonton Eskimos. On November 23, 2014, in his first playoff start, Mitchell led the Stampeders to a victory in the Western Final over division rival Edmonton Eskimos, earning them a berth in the 2014 Grey Cup. He and the Calgary Stampeders would go on to defeat the Hamilton Tiger-Cats 20–16 in the 102nd Grey Cup. Mitchell was named Grey Cup MVP. On March 3, 2015, his 25th birthday, Mitchell signed an extension with the Stampeders to keep him in Calgary through the 2018 season.

In Mitchell's second full season as the Stampeders starting quarterback he posted career highs in many passing categories leading the Stampeders to a 14–4 record, good enough for second place in the West Division behind the Edmonton Eskimos who beat them via a tiebreaker. Mitchell set personal bests in completions, attempts, yards, and touchdowns. For his efforts, he was named a CFL West All-Star. After knocking off the BC Lions in the West Semi-Final the Stamps were eliminated by the Eskimos who would go on to win the 103rd Grey Cup.

Mitchell continued to improve in the 2016 season setting career highs in passing attempts, completions, yards and touchdowns. Mitchell started in 17 games in the regular season before being rested for the final game of the season after leading the Stamps to a 15–1–1 record, including a 15-game unbeaten streak which set a CFL record for most consecutive wins by a starting quarterback. Mitchell and the Stampeders dismantled the BC Lions in the West Division Final, winning 42–15 and advancing to the Grey Cup in the process. Prior to the Grey Cup game Mitchell was named the CFL's Most Outstanding Player. Mitchell and the Stampeders played in three consecutive Grey Cup matches starting in 2016, losing the first two (104th Grey Cup and 105th Grey Cup) before winning the 106th Grey Cup 27–16 over the Ottawa Redblacks. Similar to the 2014 season, Mitchell was named the CFL's Most Outstanding Player and Grey Cup Most Valuable Player. In 2018 he became the fastest quarterback to 60 wins in CFL history, only taking 72 starts to do so, surpassing Ken Ploen who had previously held the record with 60 wins, with 78 starts. Shortly after winning the Grey Cup Mitchell announced that he would be pursuing NFL opportunities before signing another CFL contract.

Mitchell was set to become a free agent in February 2019, having decided to explore NFL opportunities before re-signing with the Calgary Stampeders organization. He attended his first NFL workout on December 5, 2018, with the Minnesota Vikings, with more than five teams inviting him to a workout and ten inquiring about him in the days and weeks subsequent to his first NFL workout. Mitchell later said he decided he would reject an offer from the Vikings because a team official told him they did not want a quarterback controversy. Mitchell also worked out for the Denver Broncos, Jacksonville Jaguars, Buffalo Bills, New York Giants and Chicago Bears. During the 2019 CFL free agency, Mitchell officially became a free agent and had not yet been signed by an NFL team with CFL teams beginning to offer contracts such as the Toronto Argonauts, the Edmonton Eskimos and the Saskatchewan Roughriders with the minimum contract being offered to Mitchell being rumored around $750,000 per season.

On February 12, 2019, Mitchell re-signed with the Calgary Stampeders, in a four-year deal worth $2.8 million. Mitchell suffered a pectoral injury in Week 3 and was subsequently placed on the six-game injured reserve list. By mid-August Mitchell was appearing to be close to a return, however, he was placed back on the 6-game injured reserve list on August 16, 2019, after suffering a minor setback. He was taken off the 6-game injured reserve list 13 days later, on August 29, 2019, and made his return to the starting lineup that weekend. In total he missed seven games during the 2019 season.

Following Calgary's second game of the 2021 season the Stamps placed Mitchell on the six-game injured reserve with a broken fibula. Mitchell returned in Week 6 having missed only three games. Mitchell would play the rest of the season despite injuring his shoulder in Week 9 against the Roughriders. The Stamps finished 8–6 on the season but were eliminated by the Riders in overtime in the first round of the playoffs. This was the first season in which Mitchell threw more interceptions (13) than touchdowns (10).

After having missed time with injuries during the 2019 and 2021 seasons in April 2022 Mitchell stated that "retirement might be the next step" if he is unable to maintain his health. After starting the first half of the season Mitchell was benched in Week 11 after throwing two interceptions and completing only nine passes on 16 attempts against the Toronto Argonauts. He was replaced by backup second-year quarterback Jake Maier. Maier continued to be the team's starting quarterback late into the season, and agreed to a contract extension, leaving Mitchell's future in Calgary in doubt. Mitchell came off the bench in the playoffs in relief of Meier, however, in the 9 minutes that he played he was unable to lead the team to victory (although surpassing Meier's passing yardage in the game) ending the Stampeders season. Following the defeat Mitchell conceded that "the writing is on the wall" and he was looking forward to a new opportunity elsewhere when his contract expired in February 2023.

Hamilton Tiger-Cats
On November 14, 2022, the Hamilton Tiger-Cats acquired the rights to Mitchell in exchange for two drafts picks and future considerations, with his contract set to expire in February 2023. A couple days later Mitchell went on record stating that he still intended to enter free agency. Nonetheless, on January 24, 2023, Mitchell signed a three-year contract worth over $500,000 CAD annually with the Tiger-Cats.

Career statistics

References

External links

Hamilton Tiger-Cats bio 
Eastern Washington Eagles bio

1990 births
Living people
American football quarterbacks
Calgary Stampeders players
Hamilton Tiger-Cats players
Canadian football quarterbacks
American players of Canadian football
Eastern Washington Eagles football players
People from Katy, Texas
Players of American football from Texas
SMU Mustangs football players
Sportspeople from Harris County, Texas
Walter Payton Award winners
Canadian Football League Most Outstanding Player Award winners